Jonas Asare (born 10 July 1997) is a Ghanaian football forward who last played for FK Javor Ivanjica in Serbian SuperLiga.

Career
Asare played with Grassland FC in Cameroon in the seasons 2015 and 2016, before arriving to Serbia during winter-break of the 2016–17 season and signing with top—league side FK Javor Ivanjica. Asare signed contract with Javor until June 2020. He made his debut in the 2016–17 Serbian SuperLiga on April 13, in a game against FK Radnički Niš. Asare was released by Javor in December 2017.

References

1997 births
Living people
Footballers from Accra
Ghanaian footballers
Association football forwards
Ghanaian expatriate footballers
Grassland FC players
Expatriate footballers in Cameroon
FK Sloga Petrovac na Mlavi players
FK Javor Ivanjica players
Serbian SuperLiga players
Expatriate footballers in Serbia